Okwanuchu is an extinct Shastan language formerly spoken in northern California. Kroeber described the language as "peculiar. Many words are practically pure Shasta; others are distorted to the very verge of recognizability, or utterly different." Golla speculates at length that the language may have mixed in another, non-Shasta language. Du Bois, interviewing a survivor of a group that the Wintu called Waymaq ("north people"), who she believed were probably identical to the Okwanuchu, recorded some words, including atsa ("water"). Golla writes that eighteen more words are found, under the name "Wailaki [also meaning 'North People'] on McCloud", in an 1884 work by Jeremiah Curtin; he too recorded atsa ("water"), and five words not found elsewhere in Shastan.

References

Sources

External links
Overview at the Survey of California and Other Indian Languages

Shastan languages
Extinct languages of North America
Indigenous languages of California